Sunrise Radio was a radio station which broadcast to the Greater Dublin area in Ireland.

It was a temporary licence station and began broadcasting in March 2006. Based in Swords, and operating on a frequency of 94.9 MHz, the station broadcast only on weekends.

Programming contributions from Polish, Russian, Chinese, Indian, African and Pakistani presenters appeared on the schedule. Programmes were a mix of English and the presenters' native tongue, with no advertising permitted under the terms of the station's licence.

The station broadcast on a temporary licence from the Broadcasting Authority of Ireland for several months in 2006 (with a licence renewal the following year), and was reputedly the "only dedicated multiethnic or polylingual radio service to broadcast" within Ireland. The station's licence was not renewed or made permanent, and the broadcast frequency was later allocated to another station, 4FM (now known as Classic Hits).

References

External links
Sunrise Radio Website

Defunct radio stations in the Republic of Ireland
Chinese-language radio stations
Russian-language radio stations
Mass media in Dublin (city)